This is the list of awards and nominations Julie Anne San Jose has received during her career.

Music

PPop Awards
{| class="wikitable"
!Year
!Recipient/Nominated Work
!Award
!Result
|-
|2019
|Herself
| Most Favorite Pop Female Artist of the Year
|

Aliw Awards

|-
|2011 || Herself || Best Teen Performer || 
|-
|2013 || Its My Time Concert || Best Female Performance In A Concert || 
|-
|2018 || #Julie || Best Female Performance In A Concert || 
|-
|2019 || Julie Sings The Diva  || Best Major Concert (Female) || 
|-
|rowspan="2"| 2020 || Better || Best Rhythm and Blues/Jazz Artist || 
|-
                   || Performer    || Entertainer Of The Year ||

Awit Awards

|-
|rowspan="5"| 2013 || I'll Be There || Best Performance by a Female Recording Artist || 
|-
                   || I'll Be There || Best Performance by a New Female Recording Artist || 
|-
                   || I'll Be There || Best Ballad Recording ||  
|-
                   || Enough || Best R&B Recording || 
|-
                   || Julie Anne San Jose || Album of the Year || 
|-
| 2014 || Pagbangon || Best Inspirational/Religious Recording   || 
|-
| rowspan="3"|2015 || Dedma || Best Rap Recording with Abra  || 
|- 
                   || Deper || Best Selling Album of the Year  || 
|-
                   || "Ikaw, Ako at Siya"  || Best Song Written for Movie/TV/Stage Play with Janno Gibbs and Jaya || 
|-
|rowspan="2"| 2017 || Chasing The Light || Best Performance by a Female Recording Artist for "Chasing The Light" || 
|-
                   || Magic Ng Pasko    || Best Christmas Recording || 
|-
|rowspan="2"| 2019 || Breakthrough || People's Voice Favorite Album Of The Year || 
|-
                   || Down For Me    || People's Voice Favorite Collaboration with Fern. || 
|-
|rowspan="4"| 2020 || Try Love Again || Best Global Recording || 
|-
                   || Bahaghari with Gloc9 || Best Collaboration Performance || 
|-
                   || Isang Gabi with Rico Blanco || Best Music Video ||  
|-
                   || Better || Best Pop Recording ||

Myx Music Awards

|-
|rowspan="2"| 2013 || I'll Be There  || Favorite Mellow Video || 
|-
|| Herself || Favorite Celebrity Vj || 
|-
|rowspan="6" | 2015  || Right Where You Belong|| Favorite Mellow Video || 
|-
||Dedma Feat. Abra || Favorite Collaboration Of The Year || 
|-
||Dedma Feat. Abra || Favorite Urban Video The Year || 
|-
||Herself || Favorite Female Artist The Year || 
|-
||Herself || Favorite Artist Of The Year || 
|-
||Dedma Feat. Abra || Favorite Music Video The Year || 
|-
|rowspan="5"|2016|| Cruisin feat. Christian Bautista || Favorite Remake Of The Year || 
|-
|| Herself || Favorite Female Artist Of The Year || 
|-
|| Herself || Favorite Artist Of The Year || 
|-
|| Tidal Wave || Favorite Song Of The Year || 
|-
|| Tidal Wave || Favorite Music Video Of The Year || 
|-
|rowspan="3"|2017  || Herself || Favorite Female Artist Of The Year || 
|-
|| Herself || Favorite Artist Of The Year || 
|-
|| Naririnig Mo Ba? || Favorite Music Video Of The Year || 
|-
|rowspan="3"|2019  || Down For Me feat. Fern || Collaboration Of The Year || 
|-
||Tayong Dalawa || Mellow Video Of The Year || 
|-
||Herself || Female Artist Of The Year ||

PMPC Star Awards For Music

|-
|rowspan="4"|2013||Herself || New Female Recording Artist of the Year || 
|-
|| Herself || Female Pop Artist of the Year || 
|-
|| Julie Anne San Jose Album || Pop Album of the Year || 
|-
|| Bakit Ngayon || Song of the Year || 
|-
|rowspan="4"|2015|| Deeper || Album of the Year || 
|-
|| Deeper || Pop Album of the Year || 
|-
|| Herself || Female Pop Artist of the Year || 
|-
|| Herself || Female Concert Performer of the Year || 
|-
|2017  || Herself || Female Pop Artist of the Year || 
|-
|rowspan="6"|2018 ||  Herself  || Female Recording Artist of the Year || 
|-
|| Naririnig Mo Ba? || Music Video of the Year || 
|-
|| Chasing The Light || Album of the Year || 
|-
||Chasing The Lights || Song of the Year || 
|-
|| Chasing The Light || Pop Album Of The Year of the Year || 
|-
|| Herself || Female Artist Of The Year || 
|-
|rowspan="5"|2019  || Regrets || Music Video Of The Year || 
|-
|| Herself || Female Recording Artist Of The Year || 
|-
|| Breakthrough || Album Of The Year || 
|-
|| Herself || Female Pop Artist Of The Year || 
|-
|| Down For Me feat. Fern || Collaboration Of The Year || 
|-
|rowspan="1"|2020  || Regrets || Female Pop Artist Of The Year || 
|-
|rowspan="3"|2021  || Herself || Female Recording Artist of the Year || 
|-
| Nobela || Revival Recording of the Year with Gloc9|| 
|-
| Herself || Female Pop Artist of the Year || 
|-
|rowspan="3"|2022  || Herself || Female Recording Artist of the Year || 
|-
| Herself || Collaboration Artist of the Year with Gloc9|| 
|-
| Herself || Female Pop Artist of the Year ||

Wish Music Awards

|-
| 2017 || Naririnig Mo Ba || Wish Original Song Of The Year By A Female Artist|| 
|-
| rowspan="4"|2019 || Your Song || Bronze Wishclusive Elite Circle Award || 
|-
| Down For Me (feat. Fern) || Urban Song Of The Year || 
|-
| Nothing Left || Wishclusive Pop Performance of the Year || 
|-
| Your Song ||  Wishclusive Ballad Performance of the Year || 
|-
| rowspan="2"|2020 || Your Song || Silver Wishclusive Elite Circle Award || 
|-
| Your Song || Wishers' Choice || 
|-
| rowspan="2"|2021 || Better ||  Wish R&B Song of the Year || 
|-
| Nobela || Wishclusive Contemporary R&B Performance of the Year ||

International recognition

International Song Contest: The Global Sound

2022

Shorty Awards
{| class="wikitable"
!Year
!Recipient/Nominated Work
!Award
!Result
!Host Country
|-
|2018
| Herself
| YouTube Star
|
||  United States of America

Top10 Awards
{| class="wikitable"
!Year
!Recipient
!Award
!Result
!Host Country
|-
|2019
| Herself
| Asia Music Icon Award
|
||  Kuala Lumpur, Malaysia

Asian Television Awards
{| class="wikitable"
|Year
!Year
!Nominee
!Result
!Host Country
|-
|2022
| Herself
| Best Leading Female Performance-Digital
| 
||  Singapore

New York Festivals TV and Film Awards
{| class="wikitable"
|Year
!Year
!Nominee
!Result
!Host Country
|-
|2022
| Limitless
| Entertainment-Variety Special Category Silver Award
|  
||  United States of America

Film and television

FAMAS Awards

|-
| 2012 || Herself || German Moreno Youth Achievement Award ||  style="background: orange" |Recipient 
|-
| 2018 || Herself || German Moreno Youth Achievement Award  || style="background: orange" |Recipient

PMPC Star Awards for Television

|-
| 2015 || Day Off ||  Best Reality Show Host with Dasuri Choi, Maey Bautista, Mike ‘Pekto’ Nacua, Boobay  || 
|-

Golden Screen TV Awards

|-
|2011 || Andres de Saya ||  Outstanding Performance by an Actress  || 
|-

Guillermo Mendoza Memorial Scholarship Foundation Box Office Entertainment Awards

|-
| 2011 || Herself || Most Promising Loveteam of 2011 with Elmo Magalona || 
|-
| 2012 || Julie Anne San Jose (Debut Album) || Most Promising Singer ||  
|-

EdukCircle Awards

|-
| rowspan="3"| 2019 || Studio 7 || Best Female Variety Show Host || 
|-
|Herself || Best Musical Artist Of The Year || 
|-
| The Sweetheart and The Balladeer || Three Most influential Concert Performs of The Year (with Christian Bautista) || 
|-

TAG Awards

|-
| 2022 || Maria Clara at Ibarra || Best Supporting Actress  || 
|-

Gawad Lasallianeta

|-
| 2022 || Maria Clara at Ibarra || Most Outstanding Actress in a Drama series  || 
|-
| 2022 || The Clash || Most Outstanding Female Entertainment Show Host  || 
|-
| 2022 || Maria Clara at Ibarra || Most Outstanding Teleserye  ||

Entertainment awards

Philippine Walk Of Fame

|-
| 2015 || Herself || Walk Of Fame Star Awardee || style="background: orange" |Recipient
|-

YouTube Creator Awards

|-
| 2019 || 100,000 YouTube Subscribers (Aybutchikik) || The Silver Creator Award || 
|-

Inside Showbiz Awards

|-
| 2019 || BreakThrough Album || Favorite Album || 
|-

USTv Awards

|-
| 2012 || I'll Be There || Best Local Video Artist || 
|-
| 2016 || Herself || Social Media Personality || 
|-

Yahoo Philippines OMG! Award

|-
| 2012 || Herself || Female Performer of the Year || 
|-
| rowspan="2"|2013 || Herself || Female Performer of the Year || 
|-
|  Julielmo || Fan Club of the Year with Elmo Magalona || 
|-
| rowspan="2"|2014 || Herself || Female Performer of the Year || 
|-
|  Bakit Ngayon ||  Song of the Year ||

The Philippine Quill Awards

|-
| rowspan="2"|2014 || Herself || What A Wonderful World Music Video || 
|-
|  Herself || The Philippine Student Quill Merit Awardee || 
|-

Globe Tatt Awards

|-
| rowspan="3"| 2012 || Herself || ThoughtMover || 
|-
|Herself || Trending Personality || 
|-
| Herself || People Choice Award || 
|-

Spinnr Hitlist Award

|-
| 2014 || Herself || Best Indie Artist ||

UE Gawad Lualhati Awards

|-
| 2014 || Herself || Inspiring Artist Of The Year || 
|-

Catholic Mass Media Awards

|-
| 2014 || Pagbangon || Best Secular Song || 
|-
| 2022 ||  Limitless || Best Digital Add - Public Service ||

PEP List Choice Awards

|-
| 2014 || Herself || Female Teen Star of the Year || 
|-

MEG Top Choice Awards

|-
| 2012 || Herself || Twitter Trendsetter of the Year || 
|-

Candy Mag Style Awards

|-
| 2012 || Herself || Most Stylish Awards || 
|-

GMAAC Workshop Recognition

|-
| 2012 || Herself || The Host Of the Most Award || 
|-

SAS Stand Out Awards

|-
| 2012 || Herself || Viewer Choice Best Artist || 
|-

Organisasyon ng Pilipinong Mang-aawit (OPM)

|-
| 2013 || Herself || Junior Ambassador || style="background: orange" |Recipient
|-

ASAP Recognition

|-
| 2012 || ASAP 24k Gold Award ||Female Artist Awardee || 
|-
| 2013 || ASAP Platinum Circle Award ||Female Artist Awardee || 
|-
| rowspan="2"|2014 || ASAP 24k Gold Award ||Female Artist Awardee || 
|-
                   || ASAP 24k Platinum Circle Award ||Female Artist Awardee || 
|-

YES! Magazine

|-
| 2012 || @MyJaps (Twitter Inc.) || Most Influential Celebrity On Social Media || 
|-
| 2012 || Newbie || 100 Most Beautiful Stars  || 
|-
| 2013 || Breakthrough || 100 Most Beautiful Stars  || 
|-
| 2014 || Groovers || 100 Most Beautiful Stars  || 
|-
| 2015 || Multihyphenate || 100 Most Beautiful Stars  || 
|-
| 2016 || Multihyphenate || 100 Most Beautiful Stars  || 
|-
| 2017 || Network Bets || 100 Most Beautiful Stars  || 
|-
| 2018 || Network Bets || 100 Most Beautiful Stars  || 
|-

ASEAN Excellence Achievers Awards

|-
| 2022 ||  Herself ||Versatile Actress of the Year|| 
|-

Rawr Awards

|-
| 2022 || Herself || Favorite Performer || style="background: orange" |TBA
|-
| 2022 || Maria Clara At Ibarra || Bet na Bet na Teleserye || style="background: orange" |TBA
|-

References

Lists of awards received by Filipino musician